Dorothy Locke (January 8, 1912 – February 4, 2005) was an American fencer. She competed in the women's individual foil event at the 1932 and 1936 Summer Olympics.

References

External links
 

1912 births
2005 deaths
American female foil fencers
Olympic fencers of the United States
Fencers at the 1932 Summer Olympics
Fencers at the 1936 Summer Olympics
Sportspeople from Brooklyn
20th-century American women
21st-century American women